Speak & Spell may refer to:

Speak & Spell (toy), an educational toy made by Texas Instruments
Speak & Spell (album), a 1981 album by Depeche Mode

See also
 Speak n Spell Music, a company in the music industry in Australia and New Zealand